Shorris is a surname. Notable persons with that name include:

Anthony Shorris (born 1957), American civil servant
Earl Shorris (1936–2012), American writer and social critic